Keikhosro Khoroush (Persian: , born 1941) is an Iranian painter and calligrapher. He graduated at the first rank in the College of Art, University of Tehran. He has been one of the most realistic Iranian painters and one of the great masters in Persian calligraphy ( Nastaʿlīq ) since 1980. He was awarded the title of the everlasting people in 2005.

Biography 
Khoroush was born in April 1941 in Tehran, Iran.

He studied in the field of mathematics at high-school but he liked arts and preferred studying painting in the university. So, he took and passed the entrance examination of the University of Tehran and earned first rank in 1961, then graduated with the same rank in 1966. He then went to U.K. and France on scholarships and visited art galleries and museums and researched on the realism painting there.

He started learning painting under the supervision of Master Ali Mohammad Heydarian (1896-1990). Khoroush became one of Heydarian's most important students. who was a founder and first professor in the Faculty of Fine Arts in the University of Tehran (established 1940) and was the most important student of Kamal-ol-Molk.

At the same time, he enrolled at the Iran Calligraphers Association. He got started learning Persian calligraphy under the supervision of Great Master Hossein Mirkhani (the Founder of Iran Calligraphers Association) and was the first person to get Momtaz Grade of the Association of Calligraphers in Iran.

In 1973, he got a master's degree and was successful in taking great master degree of Iranian Calligraphy Association in 1977. Finally, he became one of the two great masters in Persian calligraphy since this time and has calligraphied up to 40 books since the 1960s. Based on statistics, his Divan-e-Hafez book has been one of the most important calligraphied books in Iran.

Over more than 1000 of his paintings and several art works of his calligraphy (uncountable), are available in Iran and abroad (in the museums and personal collections), and sold in auctions like Tehran auction.

Works 
He is a contemporary artist and has been artistically active in the past 60 years, Almost all his paintings are based on oil and watercolor.

Painting 
In his paintings, Keikhsoro Khoroush draws Iranian landscapes and portraits of people.

Calligraphy 
He is interested in creating a form of Persian calligraphy called chalipa, but there are many Persian calligraphy art works in other forms.

Books 
In his books, he was interested in calligraphy, the books of poets or important cultural persons, in fact, every page of his books are about Persian calligraphy ( Nastaʿlīq ) artworks.

Awards 
 Iranian everlasting people in 2005.
 Master's degree of Iranian Calligraphy Association in 1973.
 Great master's degree of Iranian Calligraphy Association in 1977.
 Honorary citizen of Neyshabur city.
 Get the up-most art rank from Ministry of Culture.
 First rank of University Of Tehran.
 Pioneer Iranian artist (Member of the Association of Pioneers Iranian Artists).

Job Titles 
 Member of the Artistic Evaluation Council (the Association of Calligraphers).
 Member of the Artistic Evaluation Council (Ministry of Culture).
 Member of Founding Board of Iranian Calligraphy Association.
 Member of the Judicial Council of Calligraphy of the Islamic World.
 Art consultant of Ministry of Culture and arts.

Books List 
 The calligraphy booklet attributed to Mir-Imad / The first edition, (1974).
 Rubaiyat of Omar Khayyam / The first edition, (Published before the Iranian Revolution of 1978–79).
 Rubaiyat of Omar Khayyam / The second edition, (Published After the Iranian Revolution of 1978–79 - 1980s).
 Rubaiyat of Omar Khayyam / The third edition, (Unpublished – After the Iranian Revolution of 1978–79) from Collection of Tehran Calligraphers Society.
 Rubaiyat of Omar Khayyam / The fourth edition, (Unpublished - Before the Iranian Revolution of 1978–79) ordered by Khosro Zaiemi (available in the Private collection).
 Rubaiyat of Omar Khayyam / The fifth edition, (Unpublished - Before the Iranian Revolution of 1978–79) (available in the Private collection).
 The old and young Masnavi - Poetry by Mirza Nasir Jahromi (Published - Before the Iranian Revolution of 1978–79).
 The Booklet Of Marzdaran - Ordered by the Museum of Martyrs (Unpublished).
 A look at the tomorrow's world, 5-volume - Ordered by the Ministry of Culture and Arts (Unpublished - Before the Iranian Revolution of 1978–79).
 Divan-e-Hafez I (Published – 1980s).
 Divan-e-Hafez II (Published – 2000s).
 Layla and Majnun - Poetry by Nizami Ganjavi (Published – 1980s).
 Yusuf and Zulaikha - Poetry by Jami (Published – 1980s).
Satr nevisi Ta Ketabt (From Write a Line Calligraphy to Write a Book Calligraphy) (Published – 1980s).
 Zohre and Manuchehr (Unpublished).
 Translation of Nahj al-Balagha (Author By IMAM ALI) - Ordered By Martyr Foundation (Unpublished – 1980s).
Golab-e-Ashk - Selections Of IMAM Hussein jeremiads (Published – 2000s).
 The Principles of government and Imam ali's Commands to Malek-e-Ashtar Nakhai (Published – 1980s).
Divan-e Nurbakhsh: Poems of a Sufi Master - Poetry by Dr. Javad Nurbakhsh (Published – 1980s).
Divan-e Nurbakhsh’s accompaniment and blank verse (Added on Divan-e Nurbakhsh, later published).
 Khosro and Shirin – Poetry by Nizami Ganjavi (Published – 2000s).
 Masnavi-e-Mohammad  - Poetry by Golshan Kurdestani (Published – 1980s).
 The Book of Thunder - Poetry by Golshan Kurdistani (Published almost Of This Book).
 A Sky full of Stars - Poetry by Mehdi Soheili (Published almost Of This Book).
 Fly in the sky. Poetry by Mehdi Soheili. You have written many of his poems.
 Selections Of Kei Khosro Khoroush's chalipas (Published – 2000s).
 Four articles by Nizami Aroozi Samarghandi (Published – 2000s).
 Khajeh Abdollah Ansari's Chants (Published – 1980s).
 Strophe-poems by Hatef Isfahani /the first edition (Published – 1980s).
 Strophe-poems by Hatef Isfahani / the second edition (Unpublished- 1990s - available in the Private collection).
 Strophe-poems by Hatef Isfahani / The third edition (Unpublished- 1990s - available in the Private collection).
 Imam Khomeini's Divine Political (Published – 1980s).
 Golshan-e-raz Poetry by Shabestari /The first edition (Published – 1980s).
 Golshan-e-raz Poetry by Shabestari /The second edition (Unpublished – 2010s).
 The calligraphy booklet attributed to Mir-Imad /The second edition (Published – 1990s).
Divan-e-Sabzevari Poetry by Haj Molla Hadi Sabzevari, (Unpublished – 1980s).
 Rubaiyat of Dr. Javad Hamidi (Sarvenaz) (Published Before the Iranian Revolution of 1978–79).
 Naser Khosro Ghobadiani's Travelogue (Published – 1980s).
 The Introduction of Persian Calligraphy Exhibition's Book in Pakistan in the 1960s.
 The Introduction of Tutorial Script writing Book by Hassan Sekhavat.
 The Book of Master Farshchian (unfinished).
 The calligraphy booklet attributed to Mir-Imad /the third edition, (unfinished - available in the Private collection).
 One hundred Advices By Loghman, (Published – 1980s).
Masnavi-e-Mush-O-Gorbeh (Mouse and Cat) by Obeid Zakani, (unpublished – 1960s).

References 

Iranian calligraphers
Iranian painters
Living people
1941 births
Iranian watercolourists
Realist painters
Iranian Science and Culture Hall of Fame recipients in Visual Arts